SteamWorld is a series of video games depicting the adventures of a race of steam-driven robots in a post-apocalyptic steampunk world. The games are developed and published by Swedish video game developer Image & Form.

List of SteamWorld games

References 

 
Video game franchises introduced in 2010
Video games set on fictional planets
Indie video games
Steampunk video games